Misumena nigromaculata is a species of spider endemic to Madeira. It is typical to find them on top of yellow flowers such as Sonchus or Tolpis. Misumena vatia is a commonly found close relative of M. nigromaculata, and is found in a holarctic distribution.

References

Thomisidae
Spiders described in 1963
Endemic fauna of Madeira
Arthropods of Madeira
Spiders of Europe